The Communauté de communes de l'Ouest guyanais (CCOG) is a communauté de communes, an intercommunal structure in the French département d'outre-mer of French Guiana. It was created in 1995, and its seat is Mana. Its area is 40,945 km2, and its population was 94,677 in 2018.

Composition 
The CCOG is composed of the eight westernmost communes of French Guiana:

Administration 
The communauté de communes is led by an indirectly elected President along with a bureau communautaire composed of 9 Vice-Presidents. The president and vice-presidents are chosen by the conseil communautaire of the CCOG composed of 31 communal delegates.

President

Elected members 
The Communauté de communes de l'Ouest guyanais is governed by an elected council composed of 31 councillors from each of its 8 communes. The number of council seats each commune receives is proportional based upon their population as follows:

 13 delegates for Saint-Laurent-du-Maroni
 4 delegates for each of Mana and Maripasoula
 3 delegates for each of Grand-Santi and Apatou
 2 delegates for Papaichton
 1 delegate for each of Awala-Yalimapo and Saül

Administrative seat 
The administrative seat of the Communauté de communes de l'Ouest guyanais is located in Mana at 2 rue Bruno Aubert.

References 

Ouest guyanais
Intercommunalities of French Guiana